Cantharellus zangii is a species of fungus in the family Cantharellaceae. Described as new to science in 2012, it is found only in a small area in northwestern Yunnan, China. The fungus produces small, bright orange fruit bodies (mushrooms) with thin flesh and a long tapering stipe. Microscopically, the mushroom features thin-walled hyphae with clamp connections, and large ellipsoid-shaped spores.

Taxonomy
Cantharellus zangii was described in 2012 in the scientific journal Mycotaxon by Xiao-Fei Tian and colleagues. The type collection was made in August 2008 in the Bitahai National Natural Reserve, located in Shangri-La County, Yunnan, China. The authors classify the fungus in Parvocantharellus, a subgenus of Craterellus that was originally proposed by Guillaume Eyssartier and Bart Buyck in 2001.   The specific epithet zangii honors Chinese mycologist Zang Mu, founder of the Cryptogamic Herbarium in the Kunming Institute of Botany.

Description
The cap is smooth with an ochre to yellow colour. Initially curved inward, the cap margin eventually straightens in maturity. The golden-colored gills, which have a decurrent attachment to the stipe, are up to 2 mm high with a 1–2 mm spacing between them. They are connected by transverse cross-veins. There are short, branched gills near the cap edge. It is hollow and sometimes slightly curved. The thin flesh has a mild taste and an odor similar to plants in the genus Osmanthus.

Spores are ellipsoid, thin-walled, and hyaline (translucent), measuring 8.5–11 by 5–6.5 µm. They sometimes have multiple tiny oil droplets. Basidia (spore-bearing cells) are slender and club-shaped, usually five-spored (sometimes six) with sterigmata 5–6 µm long, and dimensions of 75–85 by 6–9 μm. All hyphae have distinct clamp connections.

Similar species include the European Cantharellus queletii, but this mushroom can be distinguished by its solid stipe and the lack of cross-veins between the gills. Another European species, Craterellus tubaeformis, has a horn-shaped fruit body with depressed caps, and grey or greyish-white gills.

Habitat and distribution
The fruit bodies of Cantharellus zangii grow on the ground singly or in groups in mixed forests. The predominant trees are Larix potaninii var. macrocarpa and Picea likiangensis. The species has been collected from only the type locality and from nearby locales in Shangri-La County (northwestern Yunnan). The type locality, Bitahai National Natural Reserve, is a highly biodiverse area and has the highest elevation and highest latitude of all wetland reserves in Yunnan.

References

External links

zangii
Fungi described in 2012
Fungi of Asia